The Bobsleigh World Cup is an annual bobsleigh competitions. It has taken place since the 1984 Winter Olympics. Below is a lists of season champions. Each table shows the country and driver only.

Combined men's
Debuted: 1985.

Medal table

Two-man
Unofficial event: 1985–1990. Debuted: 1991.

Medal table

Four-man
Unofficial event: 1985–1990. Debuted: 1991.

Medal table

Combined women's
Debuted: 2022.

Medal table

Woman's monobob
Debuted: 2021.

Medal table

Two-woman
Debuted: 1994.

Medal table

All-time medal count

References

External links
IBSF.com rank listings
List of combined men's bobsleigh World Cup champions: 1985–2007
List of four-man bobsleigh World Cup champions since 1985
List of two-man bobsleigh World Cup champions since 1985
List of two-woman bobsleigh World Cup champions since 1995

 
Recurring sporting events established in 1984
Bobsleigh competitions
World cups in winter sports